Harry Charles Salusbury Lloyd (born 17 November 1983) is an English actor. His performance in the Channel 4 miniseries The Fear (2012) earned him a British Academy Television Award nomination. He gained prominence through his roles as Will Scarlet in the BBC drama Robin Hood (2006), Jeremy Baines in the Doctor Who episodes "Human Nature" and "The Family of Blood" (2007), and Viserys Targaryen in the first season of the HBO series Game of Thrones (2011).

Lloyd played Paul Crosley in the WGN series Manhattan (2014), Peter Quayle in the Starz series Counterpart (2017–2019), and Bernard Marx in the Peacock series Brave New World (2020). He voiced Viktor in the Netflix animated series Arcane (2021–). He also appeared in Wolf Hall (2015) on BBC Two, series 1 of Marcella (2016) on ITV, and the third season of the FX series Legion (2019) as Charles Xavier.

Lloyd is also known for his theatre work, earning an Off West End Award nomination. His films include The Theory of Everything (2014), Anthropoid (2016), and The Wife (2017).

Early life, family and education
Lloyd was born in London, the son of Marion Evelyn (née Dickens), a children's publisher, and Jonathan Lloyd, who heads a literary agency. He is the great-great-great-grandson of Victorian writer Charles Dickens through his mother, who is the daughter of Peter Gerald Charles Dickens, and the great-granddaughter of barrister Henry Fielding Dickens. One of his maternal great-grandfathers was Rear-Admiral Henry Blagrove, and another maternal ancestor was composer and pianist Ignaz Moscheles. Lloyd is a cousin of biographer and writer Lucinda Hawksley, and actor and performer Gerald Dickens. Lloyd is a keen football fan and an avid supporter of Chelsea F.C.

Lloyd was educated at Eton College and, while there, made his television debut at the age of 16 as James Steerforth in the BBC's 1999 adaptation of David Copperfield opposite Daniel Radcliffe. In 2002, he was cast as young Rivers in Goodbye Mr Chips. He went on to study English at Christ Church, Oxford, where he joined the Oxford University Dramatic Society and appeared in several plays, including Kiss of the Spider Woman and The Comedy of Errors. He toured Japan with The Comedy of Errors for the society's 2005 summer tour, starring alongside Felicity Jones.

Career
In 2007, Lloyd made his professional stage debut at the Trafalgar Studios in A Gaggle of Saints, one of three short plays that make up Neil LaBute's Bash, for which he received positive reviews. He played Jeremy Baines, a student whose mind is taken over by a species of aliens called the Family of Blood, in the Doctor Who episodes "Human Nature" and "The Family of Blood". He was suggested as a possible candidate to play the Doctor when David Tennant left the role.

In 2011, Lloyd appeared as Viserys Targaryen in the HBO series Game of Thrones. He also appeared in the BBC comedy Taking The Flak, and as Herbert Pocket in Great Expectations. He had small roles in Jane Eyre and The Iron Lady, and starred as the son of a gangster in The Fear, which aired on Channel 4 in December 2012. In 2012, he appeared as Sir Edmund Mortimer in the BBC television film The Hollow Crown: Henry IV, Part 1, and he played Ferdinand, The Duke of Calabria, in The Duchess of Malfi at the Old Vic in London. He took on his first leading role in the feature film Closer to the Moon, released in 2014. Lloyd also appeared as Stephen Hawking's fictionalised roommate Brian in the Best Picture-nominated film The Theory of Everything, alongside Academy Award winner Eddie Redmayne and Academy Award nominee Felicity Jones.

In 2015, Lloyd co-created the web series Supreme Tweeter, in which he stars as a fictionalised version of himself. The following year he played Adolf Opálka in the epic war film Anthropoid, also starring Jamie Dornan and Cillian Murphy. He also appeared in the ITV series Marcella. He returned to the stage for the production Good Canary at the Rose Theatre, which was directed by John Malkovich in the role of the protagonist. In 2017, he filmed for the part of Peter Quayle in the science fiction thriller series Counterpart with J. K. Simmons, and starred as young Joe Castleman in the film The Wife, an adaptation of the book by Meg Wolitzer, opposite Glenn Close and Jonathan Pryce (the latter playing the older Joe). In 2019, Lloyd was cast as a young Charles Xavier in the third season of the FX series Legion, replacing Patrick Stewart and James McAvoy, both of whom had previously portrayed the character in the X-Men film series, the former having been approached about reprising the role in the series before the creative direction of the series changed. Later that same year, it was announced that Lloyd would be cast in the series regular role as Bernard Marx in Brave New World. In 2021, Lloyd voiced Viktor in the Netflix animated action-adventure series Arcane. In 2022, Lloyd voiced Brian McNally in the Audible original podcast series, The Miranda Obsession and Z in the video game Xenoblade Chronicles 3.

Filmography

Film

Shorts

Television

Stage

Video games

Podcast

Awards and nominations

See also
Dickens family

References

External links

 

1983 births
Alumni of Christ Church, Oxford
English male stage actors
English male television actors
Living people
People educated at Eton College
20th-century English male actors
21st-century English male actors
Male actors from London
Charles Dickens
English male Shakespearean actors
English people of Czech-Jewish descent